Yehuda Saado (in Hebrew יהודה סעדו also written Sa'ado) (born in Jerusalem on 29 April 1983) is an Israeli singer and the winner of the third season of the Israeli music competition program Kokhav Nolad.

Career
Yehuda Saado, born in Jerusalem was raised in Kiryat Ekron and learned keyboards at a young age. He served in the Israel Air Force at the Tel Nof Airbase as a technician. After release from the Air Force, he studied music at the Rimon School of Jazz and Contemporary Music at Ramat HaSharon.

In 2005, he took part in the third season of Kokhav Nolad, the Israeli equivalent of the Idol series. In the final held on August 29, 2005 in Tel Aviv, Yehuda Saado won the title with the song "Sadot Shel Irusim" (in Hebrew "שדות של אירוסים") written by Shlomo Artzi getting 918,520 votes. The runner-up Michael Kirkilan received only 370,631 votes, and third-placed Shir Biton 322,288 votes. 1.6 million viewers tuned in to watch the final.

In 2006, he released his debut single "כוכב נולד" written by Barak Feldman and Yoni Bloch. In 2007, he followed that with his debut album עירום באתי with most songs composed by Yehuda Saado himself. In 2009, he released a second single entitled "לבחור בדרך" and a follow up single "בצל דמותה". He also appeared in 2010 with the Ashdod Israeli Andalusian Orchestra.

He is married since 2007 and lives in Nir Galim with his wife Esther and two daughters.

Discography

Albums

Singles
2006: "כוכב נולד"
2010: "לבחור בדרך"
2010: "בצל דמותה"

References

External links
 
 

1983 births
21st-century Israeli male singers
Kokhav Nolad winners
Living people
People from Jerusalem
People from Kiryat Ekron